Wedding dress of Princess Beatrice may refer to:
 Wedding dress of Princess Beatrice of the United Kingdom
 Wedding dress of Princess Beatrice of York